Mike Leblanc was the bassist and vocalist for the Chicago, United States, Indie-rock group The Hush Sound during the band's "Dance Across the Country Tour" in April, May, and June 2008. Leblanc joined the band after original bassist Chris Faller decided to leave to pursue other musical interest. He was formerly a drummer for the band Dead Letter Dept. (formerly known as The Stiffs) which broke up in 2008, as well as the short lived Chicago based group Till This Day.

References 
 The Hush Sound official website
 Sweet Tangerine official website
 Dance Across the Country official website

American bass guitarists
Year of birth missing (living people)
Living people
American rock bass guitarists
The Hush Sound members